Mahfooz Sabri (born 20 May 1985) is a Pakistani first-class cricketer who played for Peshawar cricket team.

References

External links
 

1985 births
Living people
Pakistani cricketers
Peshawar cricketers
Cricketers from Peshawar